CitizenShipper is an American online auction-based peer-to-peer shipping marketplace, which aims to connect shipping customers with couriers and transport providers, especially citizens already driving the customers' routes anyway. The company matches "citizen shippers" to couriers and drivers who bid on shipments. Shippers can then choose the driver who best matches their pricing requirements and schedule needs.

History

Physicist Richard Obousy founded CitizenShipper in 2008, citing both high gas prices and U.S. Department of Transportation figures suggesting empty trucks account for 29% of single-unit truck traffic.

As a graduate student at Baylor University, Obousy wondered how he could make a little extra money for gas each month by transporting items for people with the spare capacity in his vehicle.

He imagined there were other drivers doing the same type of repetitive routes who would be interested in making extra cash. Based on this premise, he launched a very basic version of CitizenShipper in 2008 on a budget of $2,000. The earliest version of the website simply connected shippers with drivers. There were no added features such as integrated messaging, driver profiles, or background checks.

By 2012, the website steadily gained momentum, and shipping customers and drivers were connecting with each other more effectively. CitizenShipper grew into a small development team, marketing team and a customer support team.

Joining the ranks of other two-way marketplaces, or shared economy marketplaces, such as Uber and Lyft, CitizenShipper focused its energy on engaging the transportation needs of American citizens. In 2018, analysis of industry research exposed an opportunity in pet transportation in U.S homes. This information, combined with the burgeoning acceptance and expansion of two-way business models, steered the company toward embracing pet transportation as a market differentiator.

The company's website is designed to match people who need items shipped economically to certain locations with people already traveling in those directions, thus reducing overall carbon emissions. Obousy believes clients "can make a significant impact on reducing the country's carbon footprint." CitizenShipper is available nationally and now has drivers in all 50 U.S. states.

According to the CitizenShipper website, in 2021 50% of pet shipment listings received driver bids within 5 minutes and 79% within 10 minutes. CitizenShipper surpassed 1,000,000 miles in total traveled by drivers in 2016. By the end of 2021, the website reached 3,758,787 total bids from drivers using CitizenShipper, who have collectively traveled over 100,000,000 miles in total—a farther distance than a trip to the sun, plus 11 million additional miles.

As of 2022, CitizenShipper has facilitated the transport of 100,000,000 pets.

Company evolution 
As of 2022, CitizenShipper has grown to almost 40 with employees located all over the world. While pet transportation remains popular on the platform, customers are increasingly connecting with feedback-rated and background-checked drivers to transport items other than pets such as cars, boats, and motorcycles, heavy equipment, and freight.

Drivers who specialize in pet transport have branched out to "air nanny" services, in which they accompany a pet during its flight.

Programs and partnerships 
CitizenShipper introduced a $1,000 Pet Protection Plan on September 20, 2021, which covers all pet shipments listed from that date on. This program is a first among pet transportation services.

Select drivers on CitizenShipper have access to 24/7 veterinary video consultation coverage through the company's partner FirstVet. Using a mobile app, these drivers can receive professional veterinary advice, treatment recommendations, and referrals to a local animal clinic. 65% of cases through FirstVet are resolved remotely and do not require an in-person vet visit.

CitizenShipper launched a breeder-focused program in 2019 that connects U.S. breeders with consistent transportation for their litters. This program currently has over 5,000 members.

March 2022, CitizenShipper partnered with Swyft Filings, claiming that their "partnership makes it easy and affordable to incorporate your business and improve your bottom line. Swyft Filings will prepare and file all the required documents for incorporation ... the entire process can take you as little as 10 minutes."

In the news 
CitizenShipper has been mentioned in online articles that feature unique "side hustles," "innovative gigs," and flexible job opportunities, including the Los Angeles Times, Entrepreneur and Forbes. The New York Times acknowledges CitizenShipper as an alternative option to airplanes "for people who need their animal moved... [CitizenShipper] matches animals in need of transport with drivers. " 

ReadWrite has praised CitizenShipper's community and how its helped shape the brand into what is it today. "When someone posts a listing on CitizenShipper, [the listing] is seen by countless pre-vetted drivers. Consequently, interested drivers can bid on the listing, and posters get to decide which driver meets their needs. Though this is a systematic process, it’s not an impersonal one. As a company, CitizenShipper has done its best to promote personalization, above transactions. Yes, a transaction occurs. But the transaction has a very human touch."

Inc. has recognized CitizenShipper's differentiating features. "Rather than reinvent the wheel, [CitizenShipper] built on its core platform by adding proven, value-rich features over time, like rideshare-like capabilities, driver-to-customer contact channels, and 24/7 phone access to veterinarians."

Reviews
According to Courier Magazine, CitizenShipper claimed to have had zero complaints of lost or damaged shipments or of unpaid drivers during its first three years of operation. Obousy attributed this to staff listening to "every suggestion and request from every member." Significant cost savings over FedEx and UPS have been reported.

Mother Earth News stated that shipping "could be both environmentally-friendly and easier on your pocketbook .... The green shipping service is free and offered worldwide to reduce the need for inefficient delivery vehicles." Clean technology blog CleanTechnica said, "Shipping ... in a vehicle that is being underutilized helps greatly to reduce greenhouse gases .... [CitizenShipper] looks like it would get you the cheapest and one of the greenest deals out there."

According to Breeding Business, "The [CitizenShipper] online marketplace makes it fast and affordable for shipping customers to find an ideal dog transporter to match their needs, budget, and schedule. While it may sound daunting to put your pet in someone else’s care, it’s often a great option for long-distance travel .... The safer alternative is a drive with a background-verified and user-rated dog transporter. The service can also be useful for transporting puppies to new owners. Distances between puppies and new pet owners can make a meet-and-greet challenging. In those instances, CitizenShipper has become the go-to source for breeders."

Accesswire cites CitizenShipper as a platform that "eliminates the stress of air travel for pet parents."

References

External links
Official website

2008 establishments in Colorado
2008 establishments in Texas
Ridesharing companies of the United States
Online marketplaces of the United States
Logistics companies of the United States
Transportation companies based in Texas
American companies established in 2008
Transport companies established in 2008